Finsch's wheatear (Oenanthe finschii) is a wheatear, a small insectivorous passerine that was formerly classed as a member of the thrush family, Turdidae, but is now more generally considered to be an Old World flycatcher of the family Muscicapidae.

This 15–16 cm long bird breeds in semi-desert and stony hillsides from Turkey east to Afghanistan and western Pakistan. It is a short-distance migrant, wintering in Egypt, Cyprus and the Greater Middle East. The nest is built in a rock crevice, and 4-5 eggs is the normal clutch.
 
In summer the male Finsch's wheatear is a white and black bird. The white crown, central back and belly contrast with the black face, throat and wings. The tail and rump are white, with an inverted black T giving a pattern like eastern black-eared wheatear, but with a uniformly wide terminal band.

The female is brown-grey above, becoming dirty white below. The tail pattern is similar to the male's.

Finsch's wheatear feeds mainly on insects. Its call is a whistled tsit, and the song is a mix of clear notes with whistles and crackling.

The common name and scientific name commemorate the German ethnographer, naturalist and colonial explorer Friedrich Hermann Otto Finsch (8 August 1839 – 31 January 1917, Braunschweig).

References

Finsch's wheatear
Birds of Afghanistan
Birds of Central Asia
Birds of Western Asia
Finsch's wheatear
Taxa named by Theodor von Heuglin